The 2016 Super 8s were a feature of the British rugby league system, between 2015 and 2018, and were played in the top three professional divisions.

After 23 games the league table is frozen and the teams are split into 5 groups called the Super 8s. The top 8 Super League play each other once more before the top 4 team enter the playoffs for a place in the Super League Grand Final.

The bottom 4 Super League teams and top 4 Championship teams play each other in The Qualifiers for a place in next seasons Super League. The bottom 4 Championship teams play each other once more with the top 4 teams entering the playoffs for the Championship Shield with the bottom 2 teams being relegated to League 1.

The top 8 League 1 sides play each other once more before the top 5 teams enter the playoffs with 2 teams being promoted. The bottom 7 teams play each other for the League 1 Shield

Super League
 
The Super League Super 8s sees the top 8 teams from the Super League play 7 games each. Each team's points are carried over and after 7 additional games the top 4 teams will contest the play off semi-finals with the team in 1st hosting the team in 4th, and the team finishing 2nd hosting the 3rd placed team; the winners of these semi-finals will contest the Super League Grand Final at Old Trafford.

Round 1

Round 2

Round 3

Round 4

Round 5

Round 6

Round 7

Standings

(C) = Champions

(L) = League Leaders

(Q) = Qualified for playoffs

(U) = Unable to qualify for playoffs

Play-offs

The Qualifiers

The Qualifiers Super 8s sees the bottom 4 teams from Super League table join the top 4 teams from the Championship. The points totals are reset to 0 and each team plays 7 games each, playing every other team once. After 7 games each the teams finishing 1st, 2nd, and 3rd will gain qualification to the 2017 Super League season. The teams finishing 4th and 5th will play in the "Million Pound Game" at the home of the 4th place team which will earn the winner a place in the 2017 Super League; the loser, along with teams finishing 6th, 7th and 8th, will be relegated to the Championship.

Round 1

Round 2

Round 3

Round 4

Round 5

Round 6

Round 7

Standings

(Q) = Qualified for Super League XXII

(S) = Secured spot in Million Pound Game

(R) = Relegated to the Championship

Million Pound Game

Championship Shield

At the end of the regular season the bottom 8 Championship teams play each other once more, home or away. The bottom two teams are then relegated to League 1 and the top four teams qualify for the play off for the Championship Shield.

Round 1

Round 2

Round 3

Round 4

Round 5

Round 6

Round 7

Standings

(Q) = Qualified for Play-offs

(S) = Secured spot in Championship

(R) = Relegated to League 1

Play-offs

League 1 Super 8s

The top 8 teams in League 1 carry points forward and play each other once more home or away. The top five teams after 7 games will enter the playoffs.

Round 1

Round 2

Round 3

Round 4

Round 5

Round 6

Round 7

Standings

(C) = Champions

(PP) = Qualified for Promotion Playoff

(Q) = Qualified for Play-offs

(F) = Failed to reach Playoffs

Play-offs

League 1 Shield

The bottom 7 teams compete in the League 1 Shield where they play each other once more home or away. The top 2 teams compete for the League 1 Shield.

Round 1

Round 2

Round 3

Round 4

Round 5

Round 6

Round 7

Standings

(Q) = Qualified for Shield Final

(F) = Unable to qualify for Shield Final

(W) = Wooden Spoon

Final

See also
Super League XXI
2016 RFL Championship
League 1 2016 season

References

2016 in English rugby league
Super League XXI